Boris Ivanovich Akazyonok (23 March 1996) was a helmsman and anti-aircraft gunner on the ship Stary Bolshevik. For his actions during Convoy PQ 16 he and several other crewmembers of the ship were awarded the title Hero of the Soviet Union.

References

1913 births
1996 deaths
Heroes of the Soviet Union
Soviet sailors